Guldmasken (English:  Golden Mask)  was  awarded annually for private theatre productions in Swedish theatres. The award was the Swedish equivalent of the Tony Awards. It was established in 1987 and was awarded until 2009. The prize was awarded at a ceremony in early March each year between 1988 and 2009.

Categories
Guldmasken Award was  awarded in the following categories:

Best Production
Best Director
Best Actor in a Drama play
Best Actress in a Drama play
Best Actor in a Musical
Best Actress in a Musical
Best Performer/Entertainer (in a Show/Variety/Revue)
Best Supporting Actor (in a Drama play, Musical or show/variety/revue)
Best Supporting Actress (in a Drama play, Musical or Show/Variety/Revue)
Best Costume
Best Scenography/Set Decoration
Best Choreography
The Private Theatres Honorary Award
The Jury's Special Prize

References

External links
 Guldmasken.nu

Swedish theatre awards
Awards established in 1987